The Belgian National Cyclo-cross Championships were first held in 1910, and have been held annually since 1921 (with a break in 1940 due to World War II) by the Royal Belgian Cycling Federation (KBWB/RLVB). Races are run for elite men, elite women, under 23 men, junior (under 18) men, juvenile men, various masters (amateur over 30) categories and by other organisations catering for veteran riders.

Elite men 

The winners and placed riders for the professional men's event (literally "elite with contract"; a separate championship is still held for elite men without contract, following on from the earlier amateur event) each year have been:

Multiple winners

Riders in italics are still active.

Elite women

Multiple winners

Riders in italics are still active.

References 

Cycle races in Belgium
Recurring sporting events established in 1910
1910 establishments in Belgium
National cyclo-cross championships
National championships in Belgium